Luisa Veras Stefani (born 9 August 1997) is a Brazilian professional tennis player. She is the first Brazilian woman to crack the WTA top 10. She reached the milestone on 1 November 2021 when she rose to world No. 9 in doubles. On 20 May 2019, she reached a career-high singles ranking of world No. 431. She had a career-high combined junior ranking of No. 10 on 30 March 2015.

She won the mixed doubles at the 2023 Australian Open with compatriot Rafael Matos, becoming the first Brazilian pair to win a Grand Slam.

Stefani is a bronze medalist in women's doubles from the 2020 Tokyo Olympics. Representing Brazil, she partnered with Laura Pigossi to defeat Veronika Kudermetova and defending gold medalist Elena Vesnina in the bronze medal match. Stefani and Pigossi were only granted entry to the Olympics one week before the 2020 Games opened, with Stefani ranked world No. 23 in the doubles ranking and Pigossi at No. 190, and had played together once, a defeat at the 2020 Fed Cup, and yet became the first Brazilians to obtain an Olympic tennis medal, surpassing the performance of Fernando Meligeni that took 4th place in men's singles in 1996. During the campaign, they saved eight match points: four in the bronze medal match and another four against Czechs Karolína Plíšková and Markéta Vondroušová in the round of 16.

Stefani is coached by Sanjay Singh, with whom she trains at the Saddlebrook Academies.

Professional career
At the age of 14, Stefani's family moved to the United States, where it was hoped she would develop herself better in tennis. She started training at Saddlebrook Tennis Academy, and eventually got to two junior Grand Slam semifinals on doubles, the 2014 French Open and the 2015 US Open. As she attended Pepperdine University, Stefani ranked as high as No. 2 in the ITA rankings, and was also named the 2015 ITA National Rookie of the Year, having compiled a 40–6 record in her freshman season and reached the semifinals of the 2015 NCAA Singles Championships, where she lost to eventual champion Danielle Collins. Stefani made her WTA Tour main-draw debut at the 2015 Brasil Tennis Cup where she received a singles main-draw wildcard.

2019
Until 2019, Stefani tried to play both singles and doubles. The doubles kept being more productive, and once an invitation to make her WTA debut in the 2019 Monterrey Open with Giuliana Olmos led to the semifinals and a ranking increase, she decided to stop playing singles to have more chances at appearing in bigger events. Soon afterward, Stefani made her Grand Slam main-draw debut at French Open, partnering Australian Astra Sharma in doubles.

In September, with Hayley Carter as partner, she reached the first WTA doubles final at the Korea Open and, the following week, won the first WTA title at the Tashkent Open. With these campaigns, she entered the top 100 and reached a career-high ranking in doubles of No. 75 on 21 October 2019. After that, Stefani established a fixed partnership with Carter.

2020
In 2020, the Stefani/Carter duo reached the Australian Open third round, won the Challenger Series title in Newport, reached the Dubai quarterfinals in February, and won the Lexington Open in August. With that, they entered the top 40 for the first time.

At the US Open, she had her best Grand Slam campaign in her career, reaching the quarterfinals, defeating the No. 6 seeds Japan duo Shuko Aoyama/Ena Shibahara in the round of 16. It has been 38 years since a female doubles player from Brazil have gone as far in a Grand Slam tournament (the last time that Brazilians were in the quarterfinals was in Wimbledon in 1982: Patricia Medrado and Claudia Monteiro).

At the Italian Open, she had another great tournament, reaching the semifinals and losing only to the top seeds. She reached her first Premier final in October 2020, in Ostrava, playing with Gabriela Dabrowski.

2021: Historic Olympic bronze medal, first WTA 1000 title, injury & early season ending

Stefani and Carter reached their first WTA 1000 final at the 2021 Miami Open.
Stefani had to pass on the French Open after being forced to endure an emergency appendicitis surgery. With Carter getting a season-ending injury at Wimbledon, Stefani announced she would spend the rest of the year with Gabriela Dabrowski.

At the postponed Tokyo Olympics, Stefani won a bronze medal, partnering Laura Pigossi. They beat Russians Elena Vesnina and Veronika Kudermetova after saving four match points in the final super tiebreak. Pigossi and Stefani became the first Brazilians in history to obtain an Olympic medal in tennis, surpassing Fernando Meligeni's campaign that took 4th place in 1996.

Following the Olympics, seeded fifth, Stefani won her first WTA 1000 partnering Dabrowski at the Canadian Open avenging their loss in the San Jose Classic final to Darija Jurak and Andreja Klepac. The following week, they followed this successful run by another, reaching the WTA 1000 final at the Cincinnati Open by defeating current Olympic champions, second seeded pair Krejciková/Siniaková. They lost the final to Sam Stosur and Zhang Shuai. The US Open had Stefani reaching her first Grand Slam semifinal and fifth straight in 2021, only to injure her knee in the decisive game against Coco Gauff and Caty McNally and withdraw. Stefani had to sit out the rest of the season following surgery to mend the anterior cruciate ligament injury. Still in November, she rose to No. 9 of the doubles rankings. The only other Brazilian woman to rank so high was Maria Bueno before the Open era.

2022: Return to the courts, second WTA 1000 title, top 50 return 
After nearly a year of recovering from her knee injury, Stefani announced her return to play at the Pan Pacific Open in Tokyo in September 2022, partnered with Ena Shibahara. Before that, she visited the US Open to train among the WTA's best players. During the Grand Slam, she arranged with Dabrowski for both to play the 2022 Chennai Open the week before Tokyo. Stefani returned to the courts winning the WTA 250 title in Chennai along with Dabrowski.

Ranked No. 217 at the WTA 1000 in Guadajalara, playing with Storm Sanders, she reached an unprecedented Brazilian final at the WTA 1000 level with Beatriz Haddad Maia. Stefani and Sanders won the title after a highly contested match in the tie-breaker. As a result, she returned to the top 100 moving more than 160 positions up to an year-end ranking of No. 55 

By winning the WTA 125 in Montevideo alongside Ingrid Gamarra Martins, Stefani closed the season at No. 48 on 28 November 2022.

2023: Meteoric return to the top 30, Historic Major Mixed doubles title
Stefani announced she would play the 2023 Australian Open with Caty McNally,  but withdrew without playing a game once McNally injured herself in the singles tournament. Before that, she got together with McNally's former partner Taylor Townsend at the WTA 500 in Adelaide, where she won the tournament, rising to No. 34 in the world.

Also during the Australian Open, Stefani and Brazilian partner Rafael Matos were crowned champions after defeating the Indian duo of Sania Mirza and Rohan Bopanna in straight sets. It was her first Grand Slam title and also the first for a Brazilian pair at a Grand Slam.

After the Australian Open, Stefani won the WTA 500 in Abu Dhabi along with Zhang Shuai, returning to the world top 30 in doubles.

Performance timelines

Only main-draw results in WTA Tour, Grand Slam tournaments, Fed Cup/Billie Jean King Cup and Olympic Games are included in win–loss records.

Doubles
Current after the 2023 Qatar Open.

Mixed doubles

Significant finals

Grand Slam finals

Mixed doubles: 1 title

Olympics medal matches

Doubles: 1 (bronze medal)

WTA 1000 tournaments

Doubles: 4 (2 titles, 2 runner-ups)

WTA career finals

Doubles: 15 (7 titles, 8 runner-ups)

WTA Challenger finals

Doubles: 4 (3 titles, 1 runner-up)

ITF Circuit finals

Doubles: 22 (15 titles, 7 runner–ups)

Notes

References

External links
 
 
 

1997 births
Living people
Brazilian female tennis players
Tennis players from São Paulo
Tennis players from Tampa, Florida
Brazilian expatriate sportspeople in the United States
Tennis players at the 2014 Summer Youth Olympics
People from Wesley Chapel, Florida
Pan American Games medalists in tennis
Pan American Games bronze medalists for Brazil
Tennis players at the 2019 Pan American Games
Medalists at the 2019 Pan American Games
Olympic tennis players of Brazil
Tennis players at the 2020 Summer Olympics
Medalists at the 2020 Summer Olympics
Olympic medalists in tennis
Olympic bronze medalists for Brazil
Pepperdine Waves women's tennis players